Mossgiel County is one of the 141 Cadastral divisions of New South Wales, Australia. Waverley Creek is the boundary to the south. It includes Trida.

Mossgiel County appears to have been named from the nearby Mossgiel Station.

Parishes within this county
A full list of parishes found within this county; their current LGA and mapping coordinates to the approximate centre of each location is as follows:

References

Counties of New South Wales